The women's beach volleyball tournament at the 2008 Summer Olympics in Beijing was held from
August 9 to August 21, at the Beach Volleyball Ground at Chaoyang Park.

Each of the 24 pairs in the tournament was placed in one of six groups of four teams apiece, and played a round-robin within that pool. The top two teams in each pool advanced to the Round of 16. The six third-place teams were ranked against each other, with ties being broken by the ratio of points won to lost. The best two advanced to the Round of 16, while the other four played two matches (#3 vs. #6 and #4 vs. #5) with the winners of those two matches advancing as well. The losers of those matches, along with the fourth-place teams in each group, were eliminated.

The 16 teams that advanced to the elimination rounds played a single-elimination tournament with a bronze medal match between the semifinal losers.

Qualification
The top eight finishes that a team has from January 1, 2007, to July 20, 2008, on the Swatch FIVB World Tour (2007 and 2008), SWATCH FIVB World Championships (2007) and on FIVB recognised Continental Championship Finals, counts towards Olympic qualification for the Beijing 2008 Olympic Games.

There are 24 teams competing at the Olympic Games, with a maximum of two teams per country.

The United States had four teams in the top 8 of the FIVB Beach Volleyball Olympic Ranking, Brazil had seven teams in the top 24, but only two teams from each country can participate in the Olympic Games. Also, China had three teams and Germany had four teams in the top 24 ranking before the Games.

Qualifiers

The official cut off date for Olympic qualification for beach volleyball was July 20, 2008. The final Olympic Qualification Ranking for the 24 teams, was announced confirmed by the FIVB on July 24, 2008.

1 Juliana Felisberta is replaced by Ana Paula Connelly on the Brazilian team, because of an injury to Juliana.

2 Austrian team Montagnolli – Swoboda is replaced by the Swiss team Kuhn – Schwer, because of medical reasons.

Participating nations

Preliminary round
The two best teams from each group will advance to the quarterfinal round.

The composition of the preliminary rounds was announced confirmed on April 16, 2008.

The #1 seeded team is placed in pool A, #2 in pool B, #3 in C, #4 in D, #5 in E, and #6 in F. But if the host nation has a team in the top 6 teams, it is automatically seeded as #1. Therefore, China's team Tian Jia – Wang (ranked as #2,) is placed in pool A.

There was held a draw of lots between seed #7 – #9, between #10 – #12, between #13 – #18, and between #19 – #24. The Drawing of lots was hosted by the 1 to 1 Energy Grand Slam, in Gstaad on July 26, as part of the 2008 SWATCH FIVB Beach Volleyball World Tour.

After the preliminary rounds, from August 9–14, 2008, the teams placed 1st and 2nd in each pool have qualified for the playoffs. The two best 3rd placed teams have also qualified. Two lucky loser matches qualifies two more of the 3rd placed teams. The two 3rd placed teams that lose their lucky losers match, are out of the competition. Also out of the competition are teams placed 4th in their pool.

All times are China Standard Time (UTC+8)

Pool A

Pool B

Pool C

Pool D

Pool E

Pool F

Lucky loser

Of the 6 teams that are placed third in their pools, two are directly qualified to the playoffs. Of the four remaining third placed teams, two teams get to the playoffs through winning a lucky loser match.

3rd-placed teams
The rank, of the 3rd placed team from each pool, is here determined by the team's ratio. The ratio is calculated as the points won, divided on the points lost.

This table shows the results of the third placed teams after the pool play, and before the lucky loser matches.

Lucky Loser
Results of the Lucky Loser matches only.

Playoffs

Round of 16
The United States, Brazil and China managed to directly qualify two teams each, for the Round of 16, through the pool play. All six teams then won their matches in the Round of 16, and qualified for the quarterfinals. Austria and Australia also won each their Round of 16 match, and took the remaining two spots in the quarterfinals.

On August 15, one of the spectators gave birth to a baby boy, in the bathroom of the Olympic beach volleyball stadium where she was watching the women's playoff. Medical workers received the message about the woman at 10:10 a.m., and the baby was already born when they arrived 4 minutes later.

Overview
If the host nation has a team in the top 6 teams on the FIVB Olympic ranking when the Olympic Games begin, it is automatically seeded as #1. Therefore, China's team Tian Jia – Wang (ranked as #2 on the Olympic ranking,) is seeded as #1.

Quarterfinals

Semifinals

Bronze medal match

Gold medal match

Award ceremony
12:10, Aug 21, 2008

Final ranking
If the host nation has a team in the top 6 teams on the FIVB Olympic ranking when the Olympic Games begin, it is automatically seeded as #1. Therefore, China's team Tian Jia – Wang (ranked as #2 on the FIVB Olympic ranking before the Olympic Games,) is seeded as #1.

References
Notes

Sources
Beach Volleyball Results, The official website of the Beijing 2008 Olympic Games
 Competition format

External links
 Current Standing Olympic Beach Volleyball Qualification Women, at the FIVB Official Page
 Beach Volleyball at The Official Website of the Beijing 2008 Olympic Games

O
2008
Women's beach tournament
Women's beach volleyball
2008 in women's volleyball
Vol